This list has been split between:
List of words having different meanings in American and British English (A–L)
List of words having different meanings in American and British English (M–Z)

See also
 List of English homographs
 Lists of English words
 List of works with different titles in the United Kingdom and United States
 Pseudo-anglicism
 Glossary of American terms not widely used in the United Kingdom
 Glossary of British terms not widely used in the United States